Xenochroa biviata is a moth of the family Nolidae first described by George Hampson in 1905. It is found in India, Peninsular Malaysia, Sumatra and Borneo.

References 

Chloephorinae
Moths described in 1905